The Toronto Santa Claus Parade, also branded as The Original Santa Claus Parade, is a Santa Claus parade held annually on the third Sunday of November in Toronto, Ontario, Canada.

First held in 1905, it is one of the largest parade productions in North America, the oldest Santa Claus parade in the world, and one of the world's oldest annual parades.

History

The idea for the parade originated from an earlier promotion by the Eaton's chain of department stores, on 2 December 1904, when Santa walked from Union Station to the downtown Toronto Eaton store on Queen Street. The first official Toronto Santa Claus Parade was first held on December 2, 1905 with a single float. Sponsored by Eaton's, Santa was collected at Union Station, and delivered to the downtown Toronto Eaton's store. The parade grew in size each year and attracted large crowds.

From 1910 to 1912, the parade began its journey in Newmarket on a Friday afternoon, stopping overnight in York Mills and then continuing south along Yonge Street to Eaton's downtown Toronto location on Saturday afternoon.

For the 1913 parade, Eaton's brought in reindeer from Labrador to pull Santa's sleigh. Until 1915, the parade was followed by Santa holding court at Massey Hall where he would meet with up to 5,000 children.

By 1917, the parade featured a number of floats and in 1919, Santa arrived in the city by plane. From 1925 until the late 1960s, the floats from the parade were reused in Montreal where Eaton's had been holding Santa Claus Parades since 1909. This arrangement was cancelled in 1969 due to bombing threats by the Front de libération du Québec and did not resume until it was revived in the 1990s by Défilé du Père Noël, the downtown Montreal business association and is known in French as Défilé du Père Noël. Eaton's also launched a Santa Claus Parade in Winnipeg, Manitoba in 1909. Eaton's sold the Winnipeg parade to the Winnipeg Firefighters Club in 1965 and it has continued as a community parade to this day, but is now operated by the Winnipeg Jaycees.

Beginning in 1947, a recurring character, Punkinhead, was seen each year in the parade. Punkinhead was a character in a series of storybooks sold by Eaton's. By the 1950s the Toronto parade was the largest Santa Claus parade in North America. Eaton's continued to pay for the parade, which was used to promote its retail business. The company's Merchandise Display Department worked year-round at Eaton's Sheppard and Highway 400 service building to make costumes and build floats and mechanized window tableaux. In 1952, the parade was televised for the first time by CBC Television, and in 1970 the first colour broadcast was aired.

Eaton's association with the parade ended in 1982 and almost led to the parade's demise. Metro Chairman Paul Godfrey spearheaded a "Save Our Parade" campaign, and soon after a group of businessmen led by Ron Barbaro and George Cohon, with the help of 20 corporate sponsors, stepped in to save the parade. Cohon retired from the parade organization in 2014. Today the parade is funded by various corporate sponsors (including McDonald's, Canadian Tire, Lowe's, The Walt Disney Company, Toys "R" Us Canada, Mattel, and Tim Horton's) which are featured in floats. In 1983, the Celebrity Clowns began and remains a tradition of the parade today.

By 2004, the parade was drawing crowds of over half a million. In 2011, the parade route moved its southbound leg from Yonge Street, via Dundas Street West, to Avenue Road, Queen's Park Crescent and University Avenue, concluding at St. Lawrence Market; the change was made in order to provide more space for floats and spectators. In 2019, the route changed to begin from the east end of the city at Bloor and Parliament, owing to construction at its usual starting point.

The 2020 parade was cancelled as a public event due to the COVID-19 pandemic in Toronto. A broadcast-only version of the parade was filmed at Canada's Wonderland in Vaughan. It aired on December 5, 2020 and featured musical performances from Meghan Trainor, Shaggy and Dolly Parton.  The 2021 edition of the parade would once again be broadcast-only; organizers stated that it would be logistically difficult to enforce Ontario's COVID-19 vaccine mandate during such a large scale event, and also cited safety concerns due to children under 11 years of age not yet being eligible for COVID-19 vaccines. The parade returned to a public event for 2022.

Broadcasting
From 1952 to 1981, CBC Television broadcast the parade. The parade aired on CFRB radio from the 1930s through the 1950s and then on CBC Radio. CHFI-FM is the current radio broadcaster having taken over from CBC Radio in the 1980s. In 1973, the parade received its first French-language television broadcast on Télé-Métropole. The broadcast was hosted by the puppets from the francophone children's series Nic et Pic.

Global carried the parade in Canada and made its feed available in several other countries, including New Zealand, Ireland and Norway, primarily by broadcasters owned by or affiliated with Global's parent company CanWest between 1984 and 2009. On April 6, 2010, it was announced that CTV had acquired the rights to the parade, with the telecast airing on CTV and CP24.

In the United States, the Toronto Santa Claus Parade was one of several formerly featured by CBS as part of its All American Thanksgiving Day Parade special, which featured coverage of the Macy's Thanksgiving Day Parade in New York City, as well as pre-recorded coverage from other major Christmas and Thanksgiving holiday parades in the United States. This aspect has since been dropped, and the special has served as an unofficial telecast of the Macy's parade only.

Access and transit closures
Streets around the downtown core are closed from approximately 8:00 a.m. through the afternoon of parade day. While some parking is available, organizers encourage viewers to take public transit. GO Transit (via Union Station) and Toronto Transit Commission's subway stations provide access to the parade route.

See also
 List of Christmas and holiday season parades

References

Further reading

External links

Eaton's Santa Claus Parade, Archives of Ontario

Parades in Toronto
Christmas and holiday season parades
Eaton's
History of Toronto
Recurring events established in 1905
1905 establishments in Ontario
Annual television shows